Francesco Biglia (1587–1659) was a Roman Catholic prelate who served as Bishop of Pavia (1648–1659).

Biography
Francesco Biglia was born in 1587 in Mezzana Biglia, Italy.
On 10 Feb 1648, he was appointed during the papacy of Pope Innocent X as Bishop of Pavia.
On 24 Jan 1649, he was consecrated bishop by Giovanni Giacomo Panciroli, Cardinal-Priest of Santo Stefano al Monte Celio. 
He served as Bishop of Pavia until his death on 4 Jun 1659 in Milan, Italy.

While bishop, he was the principal co-consecrator of: Andreas Lanfranchi, Bishop of Ugento (1651); Benedetto Geraci, Bishop of Lipari (1651); and Filippo Casoni, Bishop of Borgo San Donnino (1651).

References

External links and additional sources
 (for Chronology of Bishops) 
 (for Chronology of Bishops)  

17th-century Italian Roman Catholic bishops
Bishops appointed by Pope Innocent X
1587 births
1659 deaths